Dorcatoma is a genus of beetles in the family Ptinidae. They are distributed in several regions of the world, excluding tropical areas. There are more than 70 species.

Beetles of this genus live in dead wood, especially that which is softened and decomposed by fungi.

Species include:
Subgenus Dorcatoma
Dorcatoma dresdensis
Dorcatoma lomnickii
Dorcatoma palmi
Dorcatoma punctulata
Dorcatoma robusta
Subgenus Pilosodorcatoma
Dorcatoma ambjoerni
Dorcatoma androgyna
Dorcatoma chrysomelina
Dorcatoma janssoni
Dorcatoma minor
Dorcatoma setosella
Dorcatoma substriata
Subgenus Sternitodorcatoma
Dorcatoma flavicornis
Other
Dorcatoma externa
Dorcatoma falli
Dorcatoma integra
Dorcatoma lanuginosa
Dorcatoma moderata
Dorcatoma pallicornis
Dorcatoma setulosa
Dorcatoma vaulogeri

References

Ptinidae
Bostrichiformia genera